The Battle of Llucmajor occurred in 1349 when Peter IV of Aragon's forces defeated and killed his cousin James III of Majorca in the town of Llucmajor on the Balearic Islands, resulting in the end of the independent Kingdom of Majorca.

Background 
In 1343, Peter IV of Aragon sought to expand his kingdom of Aragon towards Greece. However, his ships were unable to pass through Majorcan waters. To rectify this, Peter IV launched a war against the Majorcans, landing an army in Santa Ponsa, while also attacking northward into Majorcan-controlled Cerdanya and Roussillon, conquering them by 1345.

Expedition
Peter IV created a force of 16 ships: Eight galleys, six ushers, a carrack and a log. He disembarked at Cap de Formentor on 11 October 1349. The remainder of the fleet sailed to Mallorca. In all, there were 3,000 infantry and 400 men on horseback.

Battle 
King James III of Majorca led the defense against the Aragonese assault. The forces encountered each other at Llucmajor. The battle lasted all night long and ended in a tremendous loss, and saw the destruction of the Majorcan army, leading to Peter IV taking over Majorca. King James III died in the battle, while his son James IV was taken prisoner.

Violante of Vilaragut was taken prisoner in the fighting.

References
 Gabriel Ensenyat i Pujol, La reintegració de la Corona de Mallorca a la Corona d'Aragó (1343-1349), Mallorca, 1997.

External links
History of Majorca
History of Majorca site

14th century in Aragon
Llucmajor
History of Mallorca
Llucmajor
Llucmajor
1349 in Europe
Kingdom of Majorca